First Baptist Church of West Union, also known asRegular Baptist Church, is a historic building and active church located in West Union, Iowa, United States.

It was built in Greek Revival style in 1867 by brickmason Ezra Crosby.  Stained glass windows were installed in 1906.  One of the church's galleries and a baptistry were added in 1911 during repairs after a fire.

It was individually on the National Register of Historic Places in 1999. In 2015 it was included as a contributing property in the West Union Commercial Historic District.

References

Churches completed in 1867
Churches in Fayette County, Iowa
Baptist churches in Iowa
Greek Revival church buildings in Iowa
Churches on the National Register of Historic Places in Iowa
National Register of Historic Places in Fayette County, Iowa
West Union, Iowa
Individually listed contributing properties to historic districts on the National Register in Iowa